Rupen or Roupen is the Western Armenian & Indian variation of the name Ruben in Eastern Armenian & Dutch.

Rupen may refer to:

People
 Rupen is well known by Gopal Nag
Rupen of Montfort (died 1313), Cypriot nobleman
 Rupen Sevag or Ruben Sevak, real name Ruben Çilingiryan (1886–1915), Ottoman Armenian poet, prose-writer, and doctor, killed by Turkish authorities during the Armenian Genocide.
 Rupen Tarpinian or Ruben Darbinyan (1883–1968), Armenian politician and activist and government minister during the First Republic of Armenia
 Rupen Zartarian (1874–1915), Ottoman Armenian writer, educator, and political activist. Killed by Turkish authorities during the Armenian Genocide.

Places
 Rupen River, a river in Gujarat in western India
 Rupen River (Gir), a river in Gujarat in western India

See also
 Reuben
 Reuben (disambiguation)